Robert Manuel Clivillés (born July 30, 1964) is an American record producer, songwriter, arranger, and music video director most noted for his work with C+C Music Factory, a group he founded with musical partner David Cole. He is of Puerto Rican ancestry.

Clivillés and Cole also produced and wrote various hits for other artists such as  Mariah Carey, Whitney Houston, Aretha Franklin, Donna Summer, James Brown, Lisa Lisa and Cult Jam, Deborah Cooper, Scarlett Santana, and many others.

In 2015, Clivillés made his debut as a solo artist with the song "Set Me Free".

Musical career
Clivillés was a resident DJ in club Better Days in the late 1980s. David Cole was the resident keyboardist there and the two became firm friends.

In the late 1980s, Clivillés and Cole were active in the groups 2 Puerto Ricans, a Blackman, and a Dominican and the 28th Street Crew. At the time, they were the driving force of the short-lived Brat Pack. The duo were also responsible for the formation of pop group Seduction, for whom they wrote and produced a string of top-10 hits. They contributed to the career of former Weather Girls vocalist Martha Wash, who at the same time was one of the lead vocalists for the dance act Black Box. In 1990, Clivillés and Cole released a single featuring later C+C Music Factory rapper Freedom Williams, called "Get Dumb! (Free Your Body)", as The Crew. The duo's biggest success, however, was the group C+C Music Factory, which became a worldwide sensation in 1991.

After the death of his partner David Cole in 1995, Robert Clivillés continued to keep the C+C legacy alive through his own production work. In 1995, he released a solo single under the name C+C Music Factory, called "I'll Always Be Around" (#1 Billboard Dance/Club Play), on MCA Records. This was the final #1 Dance/Club Play hit for C+C Music Factory. An album titled C+C Music Factory was released by MCA in 1995 in Europe, but didn't come out in the US. This was the final studio album of new material to be released under the C+C Music Factory name. The same year, Columbia/SME Records released Ultimate, a greatest hits collection featuring a compilation of remixes and album versions of C+C Music Factory's Sony Music Entertainment singles. Two singles were released in conjunction with the album: "I Found Love" (#13 Dance/Club Play), and "Robi Rob's Boriqua Anthem" (#29 Dance/Club Play), which featured Spanish-language reggae artist El General.

In October 1996, Clivillés released an album of new material under the name Robi-Rob's Clubworld. The first single from the project, "Shake That Body", featured emcee Ya Kid K, formerly of Technotronic. The second single, "Reach", was a collaboration with Hex Hector, and featured vocals from longtime C+C vocalist Deborah Cooper. This was the final recording to include piano tracks recorded by the late David Cole.

In the 2000s, Clivillés worked with the group MVP, releasing two studio albums with the group.

In 2010, C+C Music Factory reformed, with Eric Kupper stepping in to replace Cole.

In May 2015, Clivillés made his debut on Billboard's Hot Dance Club Songs chart with the song "Set Me Free", featuring vocals by Kimberly Davis of the band Chic. The music video for "Set Me Free" makes reference to Clivillés' father's suicide.

In June 2021, Clivillés produced and released the song "Yo Soy Latino (Vamos a Bailar)" by Latinos Del Mundo.

In August 2021, he was interviewed by director Maria Soccor for the documentary Freestyle Music: The Legacy, which is currently in production.

Controversy
In 1989, Clivillés and Cole wrote a song titled "Get Dumb (Free Your Body)" that was originally performed under the name The Crew, featuring Freedom Williams, and later by Seduction. They allegedly illegally sampled portions of "The Music Got Me", which was written by Boyd Jarvis of early-1980s music group Visual. Jarvis sued them for copyright infringement in 1990, and demanded $15 million in royalties.

Four years later, Kevin McCord filed a copyright infringement lawsuit against Mariah Carey, Cole, Clivillés, and Columbia Records, because, according to McCord, they took parts of his song called "I Want to Thank You" and created "Make It Happen" out of it without permission.  Although the allegations were proven false, McCord eventually accepted a settlement offer of about US$500,000.

Discography

with 2 Puerto Ricans, a Blackman, and a Dominican
 "Do It Properly" (single) (1987)
 "Scandalous" (single) (1989)

with The 28th Street Crew
 I Need a Rhythm (1989)
 "O" (1994)

with The Crew
 "Get Dumb! (Free Your Body) (feat. Freedom Williams)" (single) (1990)

with C+C Music Factory

with MVP
 Stagga Lee presents MVP (2003)
 Hip Hop, Clubs, Girls & Life Vol. 1 (2006)

Solo
Albums
 Robi Rob's Clubworld (1996)
 Robi Rob's Clubworld – House of Sound presents Clubworld Shut Up and Dance (1996)

Singles
 "Set Me Free" (feat. Kimberly Davis) (2015)

Other releases
 Greatest Remixes Vol. 1 (as Clivillés + Cole) (1992)

References

External links
  Robert Clivilles interview, 2004

Musicians from New York City
1964 births
Living people
Record producers from New York (state)
Club DJs
Remixers
Grammy Award winners
American people of Puerto Rican descent
C+C Music Factory members